The Mixed Doubles tournament of the 2016 BWF World Junior Championships is a badminton world junior individual championships for the Eye Level Cups, held on November 8–13. The defending champion of the last edition is Zheng Siwei / Chen Qingchen from China. He Jiting and Du Yue of China won the gold medal in this event.

Seeded

  He Jiting / Du Yue (champion)
  Rinov Rivaldy / Apriani Rahayu (quarterfinals)
  Hiroki Okamura / Nami Matsuyama (quarterfinals)
  Pakin Kuna-anuvit / Kwanchanok Sudjaipraparat (third round)
  Paweł Śmiłowski / Magdalena Świerczyńska (second round)
  Rodion Alimov / Alina Davletova (fifth round)
  Zhou Haodong / Hu Yuxiang (finals)
  Miha Ivanič / Nika Arih (third round)
  Amri Syahnawi / Vania Arianti Sukoco (quarterfinals)
  Zhu Junhao / Zhou Chaomin (fifth round)
  Pacharapol Nipornram / Ruethaichanok Laisuan (fifth round)
  Andika Ramadiansyah / Angelica Wiratama (fourth round)
  Robert Cybulski / Wiktoria Dąbczyńska (second round)
  Chan Yin Chak / Ng Tsz Yau (fifth round)
  Miha Ivančič / Petra Polanc (third round)
  Chen Tang Jie / Toh Ee Wei (semifinals)

Draw

Finals

Top half

Section 1

Section 2

Section 3

Section 4

Section 5

Section 6

Section 7

Section 8

Bottom half

Section 9

Section 10

Section 11

Section 12

Section 13

Section 14

Section 15

Section 16

References

External links
Official Pages
Main Draw

Mixed
World Junior